Sibgatullah Ansari or Sibakatullah Ansari has served as a MLA representing Mohammadabad in Ghazipur district, Uttar Pradesh, India from 2007 to 2017. He is the elder brother of Mukhtar Ansari and Afzal Ansari.

Positions held
Sibgatullah Ansari has been elected 2 times as MLA.

See also
 Shaukatullah Shah Ansari
 Faridul Haq Ansari

References

Indian politicians convicted of crimes
People from Ghazipur
Living people
Samajwadi Party politicians
Criminals from Uttar Pradesh
Bahujan Samaj Party politicians from Uttar Pradesh
Quami Ekta Dal politicians
1951 births